The members of the 7th convocation of the National Assembly of Artsakh were elected on 31 March 2020.

Members of the National Assembly

See also 

 Second Harutyunyan government

References

External links 

  National Assembly website

Artsakh
Government of the Republic of Artsakh